The ashy-throated warbler (Phylloscopus maculipennis) is a species of leaf warbler (family Phylloscopidae). It was formerly included in the "Old World warbler" assemblage.

It is found in Bhutan, China, India, Laos, Myanmar, Nepal, Pakistan, Thailand, and Vietnam. Its natural habitats are temperate forests and subtropical or tropical moist lowland forests.

References

ashy-throated warbler
Birds of the Himalayas
Birds of Yunnan
Birds of Myanmar
Birds of Laos
ashy-throated warbler
ashy-throated warbler
Taxonomy articles created by Polbot